The Six Dome Synagogue is a landmark of Quba, erected at the end of the nineteenth century. It is located in the village of Gyrmyzy Gasaba of Quba district, Azerbaijan. A similar synagogue also operates in Istanbul. The synagogue was the center of religious education. Now the synagogue is open for public.

History 
A synagogue located in the Qırmızı Qəsəbə of Quba District was built by the architect Gilel Ben Haim in 1888. The architecture of the building has an oriental style. It is the symbol of six-day migration of residents of the Gilgat village to the Red Village within 6 days. The building has 14 main windows. The height of the wall of the building is 7 meters.

For a long time, the building was used as a warehouse, then a sewing workshop. After the restoration of the independence of Republic in 1991, the prayer house was returned to the residents. Restoration work began in 1995 with the initiative of Mardakhai Abramov and Semyon Nisanov who were representatives of Qırmızı Qəsəbə, continued until October 1995. The celebrations for the revival of the six-dome synagogue in Qırmızı Qəsəbə were held on October 11, 2001. Although the restoration was first completed in 2005

Gallery

See also 
 List of synagogues in Azerbaijan
 Synagogues in Azerbaijan

References 

Synagogues completed in 1888
Synagogues in Azerbaijan
Former synagogues
Synagogue buildings with domes